Euophrys gracilis is a jumping spider species in the genus Euophrys that lives in Lesotho and South Africa. It was first described in 2014.

References

Salticidae
Fauna of Lesotho
Spiders described in 2014
Spiders of Africa
Spiders of South Africa
Taxa named by Wanda Wesołowska